Middle School Attached to Northwestern Polytechnical University (NPUMS) or Xigongda High School is a secondary school (including grades 7–12) in Xi'an, Shaanxi Province, China.

It is located in the southern suburbs of Xi'an and covers an area of over 34,000 square meters. The school's staff consists of 235 people and hosts more than 4,000 students. Since 1995, Xigongda High School has rapidly developed. From 2000 to the present, 98% of its students have scored at or above the required score on their college entrance examination boards to get into leading universities.

It is often ranked as one of the top 5 middle schools in China in terms of the number of students matriculating at Peking University and Tsinghua University. For instance, in 2020, the number of students admitted to these top two universities in China was 87, ranked the 4th nationally. Meanwhile, NPUMS also consistently has the most number of students winning national and international level competitions in Shannxi province and across northwestern China.

History
Founded in 1971, the school became one of the key schools in Shaanxi by 1985, and eventually "the demonstrate school in Shaanxi" on 14 April 2009.

Academic performance
Students from NPUMS tend to get a very high score in the Zhongkao and Gaokao of the Chinese mainland.

According to the results of the Gaokao (the entrance examination of the colleges in Chinese mainland), 104 students in the NPUMS received an offer for Tsinghua University (TSU) and Peking University (PKU) in 2013. NPUMS is the only school outside of Beijing that has received over 100 offers from TSU and PKU.

References

External links

 Middle School Attached to Northwestern Polytechnical University 
 The official page of the NPUMS(English version)

High schools in Shaanxi
Schools in Xi'an
Northwestern Polytechnical University
Junior secondary schools in China
Educational institutions established in 1971
1971 establishments in China